Senator Stuart may refer to:

Alexander Hugh Holmes Stuart (1807–1891), Virginia State Senate
Archibald Stuart (1795–1855), Virginia State Senate
Charles E. Stuart (1810–1887), U.S. Senator from Michigan
Eugene P. Stuart (1927–2002), Kentucky State Senate
George L. Stuart Jr. (fl. 1970s–1990s), Florida State Senate
Harry Carter Stuart (1893–1963), Virginia State Senate
John T. Stuart (1807–1885), Illinois State Senate
Richard Stuart (born 1964), Virginia State Senate
William Corwin Stuart (1920–2010), Iowa State Senate

See also
Senator Stewart (disambiguation)